Cowick may refer to:

Cowick, Devon
East Cowick, Yorkshire
West Cowick, Yorkshire
Cowick Hall, Yorkshire